= Himmetoglu oil shale deposit =

The Himmetoğlu oil shale deposit is located in the southwestern part of Bolu Province, Turkey. It occurs in the form of a successive, predominantly brown and brownish grey oil layers between pyroclastic outcrops. Himmetoğlu oil shale basin is of Neogene age. Volcanism and tectonic activities had considerable influences on the environmental conditions during the deposition period.

The deposition of the organic matter was controlled by the volcanism and the initial characteristics have been preserved without further improvement in the maturity of the organic matter. The drill-hole data shows three main zones. From top to bottom are bituminous marl (BLM), bituminous banded marl (BBM) and the major oil shale formation of Himmetoğlu (HOS) seam. Himmetoğlu Oil Shale strata overlie a lignite zone and extend throughout the deposit. The amount of the organic matter decreases from the outermost layer towards the bottom parts while the amount of zeolites increases. Himmetoğlu oil shale seam consists of more than 50% liptinite, 20 – 50% huminite and 0 – 20% inertinite maceral groups and is characterized by its high organic content .

The origin of the organic matter is mainly algae and plants. The major inorganic constituents in the organic rich zones are calcite, dolomite, silica and considerable amounts of pyrite. Economic Grade Oil Shale (EGOS) over an oil shale deposit was defined by 5 m minimum seam thickness, 750 kcal/kg minimum upper calorific value and 4% minimum oil content. The average calorific value of the EGOS zone is around 4900 kcal/kg. The in-place oil content of Himmetoğlu oil shale is 43% by weight or approximately 482 L/ton shale. However, the average total sulphur content is high (2.5%) due to considerable amount of pyrite. Himmetoğlu oil shale is the highest quality oil shale deposit in Turkey. Himmetoğlu oil shale zone is being excavated to exploit an underlying high quality lignite seam, utilized for domestic heating. On account of its high thermal quality, Himmetoğlu oil shale is an attractive alternative for thermal power generation in Turkey, which relies mostly on poor quality lignites.
